Rubus × suspiciosus (or Rubus suspiciosus) is a naturally-occurring hybrid species of flowering plant in the blackberry genus Rubus, family Rosaceae, native to Madeira and the Canary Islands. Its parents are thought to be Rubus bollei and R. ulmifolius.

References

suspiciosus
Interspecific plant hybrids
Flora of Madeira
Flora of the Canary Islands
Plants described in 1910